Sergey Arsentyevich Korepanov (born May 9, 1964 in Izhevsk, Udmurtskaya Respublika) is a Kazakhstani race walker.

Achievements

External links
 

1964 births
Living people
People from Izhevsk
Russian male racewalkers
Kazakhstani male racewalkers
Athletes (track and field) at the 1994 Asian Games
Athletes (track and field) at the 1998 Asian Games
Athletes (track and field) at the 1996 Summer Olympics
Athletes (track and field) at the 2000 Summer Olympics
Athletes (track and field) at the 2004 Summer Olympics
Olympic athletes of Kazakhstan
Kazakhstani people of Russian descent
Asian Games medalists in athletics (track and field)
Asian Games gold medalists for Kazakhstan
Asian Games silver medalists for Kazakhstan
Medalists at the 1994 Asian Games
Medalists at the 1998 Asian Games
World Athletics Race Walking Team Championships winners